The Fall and Rise of Hugh Cornwell is a compilation album by English musician Hugh Cornwell, released on 28 August 2015 by Invisible Hands Music on both CD and vinyl.

It is Cornwell's first ever anthology of his post-Stranglers solo career, collecting 12 tracks from his first six solo albums (two tracks from each) plus a new studio recording of the live favourite "Live It and Breathe It" (CD and digital only). Due to time limitation of the vinyl version, tracks from Cornwell's 2012 album Totem and Taboo were omitted on all formats.

Critical reception 

David Jeffries of AllMusic wrote that the collection "subscribes to the "leave them wanting more" theory, as it whets the appetite instead of fully satisfying." Jeffries would have liked it to include more tracks, "but brevity is the thing here," he wrote, "and this tight, no-filler track list packs quite the punch."

Tim Peacock of Record Collector felt that the album's contents "vividly reveal that [Cornwell] remains a creative force to be reckoned with." He wrote: "Mired in glossy 80s production values, the selections from Wolf have, admittedly, dated, but the hooky, bittersweet "Under Her Spell," the mellow, poetic "Cadiz" and the No More Heroes-esque punch of Hooverdam highlight "Please Don't Put Me on a Slow Boat to Trowbridge" all serve notice that Cornwell's post-Stranglers oeuvre ought to be regarded with considerably more respect."

Goldmine magazine's Patrick Prince felt that the only time the compilation "slips and falls" is when it "temporarily embarks into the slick area of MTV-ish '80s" in songs like "Break of Dawn" and "First Bus to Babylon." Otherwise, he was positive, writing, ""Under Her Spell" is a wonderful Syd Barrett-type sing-a-long to a '60s Who beat; "Please Don't Put Me on a Slow Boat to Trowbridge" is close to the pop aggression that made the Jam unique in their day; and "Lay Back on Me Pal" has a nice case of its own Britpop ... but it's all Hugh Cornwell."

Track listing

Personnel 
See individual albums for full personnel credits.

Laurie Latham – producer (1, 8, 9, 11)
Liam Watson – producer (2, 7)
Gary Langan – producer (3, 6)
Hugh Cornwell – producer (4, 12), artwork concept 
Ian Ritchie – producer (4, 12)
Danny Kadar – producer (5, 10)
Tony Visconti – producer (5, 10)
Miles Showell – mastering (at Abbey Road Studios)
Sara-Jane Morley – design
Charles Kennedy – liner notes

References 

Hugh Cornwell albums
2015 compilation albums
Albums produced by Laurie Latham
Albums produced by Liam Watson (record producer)
Albums produced by Tony Visconti